Baldur Blauzahn (Baldur blue tooth) is a German comedy television series, broadcast in 1990 on WDR.

See also
List of German television series

External links
 

German comedy television series
1990 German television series debuts
1990 German television series endings
German-language television shows
Das Erste original programming